No Bird Sing is an alternative hip hop group from Minneapolis, Minnesota. In 2013 they signed to Strange Famous Records.

Members
 Joe Horton - rapper/piano/producer
 Robert Mulrennan - guitarist/producer
 Graham O'Brien - drummer/producer

Discography
Albums
 No Bird Sing (Self Released, 2009)
 Theft of the Commons (Crushkill Recordings, 2011)
 Definition Sickness (Strange Famous Records and F to I to X, 2013)

References

External links
No Bird Sing on Facebook

American hip hop groups
Musical groups established in 2008
American musical trios
Musical groups from Minnesota